Draba sibirica is a species of flowering plant belonging to the family Brassicaceae.

Its native range is Greenland, Eastern Europe to Mongolia.

References

sibirica